The Copa Centenario de la AFA was an official Argentine football cup competition contested by teams playing in Primera División. The championship was organized by the Argentine Football Association in 1993 in order to celebrate its 100th anniversary. The winner of this tournament was the Gimnasia y Esgrima (LP), who defeated River Plate in the final match.

History
Its model being based on the Coppa Italia, or the Spanish Copa del Rey, all the squads of Primera División who participated in the 1992–93 season (except for Talleres de Córdoba and San Martín de Tucumán), played home and away matches with their classic rivals ('derby matches') during the first phase. Afterwards, teams played two other rounds (winners' and losers' bracket), following a system of "double elimination".

Gimnasia y Esgrima was the winner on the winners' bracket, while River Plate won the losers' bracket. The final match was played in January 1994 at Gimnasia's venue, Carmelo Zerillo Stadium. Gimnasia needed to win the match to become the champion, while River Plate had to defeat El Lobo in two opportunities, as River Plate had accessed to the final by winning the losers' round. However, an additional match became unnecessary, as Gimnasia defeated River by 3–1, thereby winning the only edition of the Copa Centenario. This Cup constitutes until today one of the two official titles that Gimnasia y Esgrima (LP) has won in the Argentine top-division competitions, the other one being the 1929 Primera División championship. These conquests are celebrated with the "two stars" often displayed on the team's jerseys.

As winners of the Copa Centenario, Gimnasia y Esgrima had the privilege to play the friendly Sanwa Bank Cup against the champion of 1994 Japanese League, the Verdy Kawasaki. That game finished in a 2–2 draw, and it was decided on penalties, Verdy Kawasaki being the winners.

First round
First Leg: between June 3 and July 3, 1993. Second leg: between July 2 and July 11, 1993.

|}
Winners qualified to First winners Round, losers advanced to First losers Round

Winners round

First winners round
Played on July 11, 1993.

Bye: River Plate
Winners qualified to Second winners Round, losers advanced to Second losers Round

Second winners round
Played on July 18 & 25, 1993.

Bye: Belgrano
Winners qualified to Third winners Round, losers advanced to Third losers Round

Third winners round
Played on August 1, 1993.

Bye: Gimnasia y Esgrima (LP)
Winners qualified to Winners round Final, loser advanced to Third losers round

Winners round Final
Played on August 7, 1993.

Winner qualified to the Final, loser advanced to Losers Round Final

Losers round

First losers round
Played on July 11, 1993.

Bye: Boca Juniors

Second losers round
Played on July 18 & 25, 1993.

Bye: Deportivo Mandiyú

Third losers round
Played between July 25 & August 8, 1993.

Bye: San Lorenzo

Fourth losers round
Played on August 14 & 16, 1993.

Bye: Argentinos Juniors

Fifth losers round
Played on August 27, 1993.

Bye: San Lorenzo

Sixth losers round
Played on December 21, 1993.

Losers round Final
Played on January 21, 1994.

Final

Top goalscorer

References

C
Centenario